Diplomates Football Club du 8ème Arrondissement, usually known as DFC 8ème Arrondissement or DFC8 for a short is a football (soccer) club from Central African Republic based in Bangui. The team have recently qualified for the round of 32 of 2012 CAF Champions League.

Achievements
Central African Republic League: 4
 2006, 2011, 2016, 2021.

Central African Republic Coupe Nationale: 1
 2010.

Performance in CAF competitions
CAF Champions League: 2 appearances
2012 – Round of 32
2022 - First Round

CAF Confederation Cup: 1 appearance
2011 – Preliminary Round

Current Players

Football clubs in the Central African Republic
Bangui
1987 establishments in the Central African Republic
Association football clubs established in 1987